The Kŭmgangsan Ch'ŏngnyŏn Line is an electrified standard-gauge trunk line of the Korean State Railway in North Korea running from Anbyŏn to Kamho.

History
The line was originally built by the Chosen Government Railway (Sentetsu) as part of the Tonghae Pukpu Line, from Anbyŏn on Sentetsu's Kyŏngwŏn Line to Yangyang. The construction and opening of the line took place in several stages, with the first section opening on 1 September 1929, and the last on 1 December 1937. Plans were made to extend the line from Yangyang to Pohang, but Japan's defeat in the Pacific War and the subsequent collapse of the General-Government of Korea prevented completion of the extension.

After the partition of Korea, the line was split between the North and South, with the section from Anbyŏn to Kamho becoming the Kŭmgangsan Ch'ŏngnyŏn Line in the north, while the section from Chejin to Yangyang became the Tonghae Pukpu Line operated by the Korean National Railroad.

Electrification of the line was completed on 15 April 1997.

In 2007, after the reconstruction of the disused section between Kamho and Jejin, passenger trains began operating from the south to bring southern tourists to the Mount Kŭmgang Tourist Region. More than one million civilian visitors crossed the DMZ until the route was closed following the shooting death of a 53-year-old South Korean tourist in July 2008. Plans are being considered which would see the line become part of a trans-Korean line from Pohang to Tumangang, to connect South Korea's railway network to the Trans-Siberian Railway.

Route

A yellow background in the "Distance" box indicates that section of the line is not electrified.

References

Railway lines in North Korea
Standard gauge railways in North Korea